Psedaleulia is a genus of moths belonging to the family Tortricidae.

Species
Psedaleulia dumetosa Razowski & Pelz, 2003
Psedaleulia manapilao Razowski & Wojtusiak, 2008
Psedaleulia qualitata Razowski, 1997

See also
List of Tortricidae genera

References

External links
tortricidae.com

Euliini
Tortricidae genera